Your Sister's Sister is a 2011 American comedy-drama film written and directed by Lynn Shelton and starring Emily Blunt, Rosemarie DeWitt, and Mark Duplass. The film premiered on September 11, 2011, at the Toronto International Film Festival, and was released in the United States on June 15, 2012.

Plot
Jack is struggling emotionally a year after the death of his brother. His friend (and his brother's ex-girlfriend) Iris offers to let him stay at her father's isolated island cabin, to restore his spirits. Upon arrival, he finds Iris's sister Hannah, a lesbian who has recently broken up with her partner and is staying at the cabin without Iris's knowledge.

They talk and drink together, and end up sleeping together, using Hannah's condom. Iris arrives at the cabin unexpectedly the next morning, and Jack suggests that he and Hannah shouldn't tell her they slept together. Iris later tells her sister that she's fallen in love with Jack.

The next day, Iris mentions that Hannah wants to have a baby. Jack examines the used condom, and finds Hannah had poked holes in it. Hannah confesses to Iris she slept with Jack. Iris confronts Jack about it, and Jack accuses Hannah of stealing his sperm. Hannah admits it, but says she would never have slept with Jack if she had known Iris was in love with him. Jack is stunned to hear Iris loves him, and Iris is stunned that Hannah told him.

Later that night, Jack talks to Iris and apologizes. He reveals to Iris that he was only with Hannah because he can't be with her, which breaks Iris's heart because they could have avoided it all if only they had confessed their feelings towards each other sooner. Both Jack and Iris break down crying, and Jack leaves. Over the next day or so, the sisters gradually reconcile, with Iris offering to help Hannah to raise the child should she give birth.

Eventually, Jack returns to the cabin and requites Iris's love, also offering to help Hannah to take care of her possible baby. The trio return to the city, and the final scene has Hannah taking a home pregnancy test with Iris and Jack joining her to see the result, which is not revealed.

Cast
 Emily Blunt as Iris
 Rosemarie DeWitt as Hannah
 Mark Duplass as Jack
 Mike Birbiglia as Al

Production
The film was shot in 12 days on Fidalgo Island and in the San Juan Islands of Washington state. Rachel Weisz was originally cast to play the character of Hannah, but had to drop out three days before the shoot. Rosemarie DeWitt was cast the day before the shoot began. The actors partly improvised their dialogue.

Reception
Your Sister's Sister has an approval score of 83% on Rotten Tomatoes based on reviews from 145 critics, with an average rating of 7.00/10. The consensus reads, "Superbly acted and satisfyingly engaging, Your Sister's Sister subverts rom-com conventions with sensitive direction, an unconventional screenplay, and a big heart."  On Metacritic the film has a score of 72 out of 100 based on reviews from 29 critics.

Remake

A French remake entitled  (Et Ta Sœur in French speaking markets) premiered in 2014. The film was written and directed by Marion Vernoux and stars Virginie Efira,  and Géraldine Nakache as Marie, Pierrick and Tessa, the respective analogues of Iris, Jack and Hannah. It is the second Lynn Shelton film to be remade in France after Humpday three years earlier.

References

External links
 

2011 comedy-drama films
2011 films
2011 LGBT-related films
American comedy-drama films
American independent films
Lesbian-related films
Films directed by Lynn Shelton
Films shot in Washington (state)
LGBT-related comedy-drama films
2011 independent films
Films about sisters
2010s English-language films
2010s American films